KamAZ-6282 is the urban large class low-floor electric bus codeveloped by NefAZ and KamAZ. Mass production of this model began in 2018.

The bus has been commonly used as part of the rollout of electric buses in Moscow.

References

External links 
 Model description on official KamAZ site

Kamaz
Electric buses